Emma Wortelboer (born 26 October 1996 in Deventer) is a Dutch television presenter who has worked for BNNVARA since 2015. She grew up in Manderveen and went to school at Het Erasmus in Almelo. Wortelboer was the Dutch spokesperson for the Eurovision Song Contest 2019. Her expressive reaction to the Dutch victory at the contest went viral.

Work 
Spuiten en Slikken (BNN, 2016-2018)
3 op Reis Midweek (BNNVARA, 2017)
Club Hub (NPO 3, 2017–present)
Spuiten en Slikken Sekstest 2018 (BNNVARA)
De Wereld Draait Door (YUNG DWDD) (2018–2020)
Emma's Peepshow (2018–present)

References

Living people
1996 births
Dutch television presenters
Dutch women television presenters
21st-century Dutch women